Wallachia (Walachia, Valachia, Valahia) is a historical and geographical region of Romania.

Wallachia may also refer to:

Places
Generally regions inhabited by the Wallachs or Vlachs:
 "Bogdano-Wallachia" (Bogdan's Wallachia), "Small Vallachia", "Valachia Minor", "Moldo-Wallachia", "Maurovlachia", "Black Wallachia", "Moldovlachia", "Rousso-Vlachia", "L'otra Wallachia" (the "other Wallachia"), alternate names for Moldavia, a region in eastern Romania
Morlachia, a region in modern Croatia
Cisalpine Wallachia/Walachia Citeriore (also called "Vulaska", "Vlaska", "Valachia", "Vlaskozemski", Parvan vallachiam, etc.), alternate names for Banat, a region in south western Romania
 Great Wallachia, a region in Thessaly, Greece
 Greater Wallachia (Muntenia), a region in Romania east of the Olt River
 Little Wallachia (disambiguation)
 Lesser Wallachia (Oltenia), a region in Romania west of the Olt River
 Imperial Wallachia, the name used for Oltenia under Habsburg occupation (1718–1739) 
 Moravian Wallachia (Valašsko in Czech), a region in the Beskid Mountains of Czechia
 Old Wallachia (Stari Vlah), a region in eastern Bosnia and Herzegovina and southwestern part of Serbia
 Sirmium Wallachia, a region on the Sava River
 Upper Valachia of Moscopole and Metsovon, a region through south-western Macedonia, Albania and Epirus
 Valahia Transalpina, a name for regions of Făgăraș and Hațeg
 White Wallachia, a region in Moesia

Other regions with similar-sounding names include:
 Wallacea, a grouping Indonesian islands
 Wallacia, New South Wales
Kingdom of Wallachia, a micronation

People
 Ieremia Valahul (Italian: Geremia da Valacchia) (Jon Stoika, 1556–1625), Capuchin priest, born in Tzazo, Moldavia ("Vallachia Minor" or "Piccola Valacchia", i.e. Small Wallachia) Romania, beatified in 1983
 Saint Blaise (Croatian: Sveti Vlaho, Greek: Agios Vlasios, died 316), patron saint of Dubrovnik, an Armenian martyr
 Nicolaus Olahus (Latin for Nicholas, the Vlach; Hungarian: Oláh Miklós, Romanian: Nicolae Valahul, 1493–1568), Archbishop of Esztergom

See also 
 Oláh (surname)
 Vlach, a blanket term covering several modern Latin peoples descending from the Latinised population in Central, Eastern and Southeastern Europe
 Volokh (disambiguation), an alternate spelling (East Slavic)
 Wallach (disambiguation)
 Wallack
 Wallich, an unrelated, but phonetically similar name
 Night of Walachia, the main antagonist of Melty Blood
Walchia, a fossil plant genus